Joseph Roland Jacques Locas (12 February 1926 in Montreal, Quebec – 26 September 1985) was a Canadian professional ice hockey forward who played 59 games in the National Hockey League for the Montreal Canadiens.

External links

1926 births
1985 deaths
Canadian expatriate ice hockey players in the United States
Canadian ice hockey forwards
Chicoutimi Saguenéens (QSHL) players
Cincinnati Mohawks (AHL) players
Dallas Texans (USHL) players
French Quebecers
Montreal Canadiens players
Quebec Aces (AHL) players
Ice hockey people from Montreal